Erepta setiliris is a species of air-breathing land snail, a terrestrial pulmonate gastropod mollusk in the family Helicarionidae. This species is endemic to Réunion Island.

References

Helicarionidae
Gastropods described in 1859
Taxa named by William Henry Benson